George Baxter may refer to:

 George Baxter (printer) (1804–1867), English artist and printer based in London
 George Baxter (cricketer) (fl. 1792–1830), English cricketer
 George A. Baxter (1771–1841), American educator and college president
 George W. Baxter (1855–1929), American politician and territorial governor of Wyoming
 Sir George Baxter, 1st Baronet (1853–1926) of the Baxter baronets
 George Robert Wythen Baxter (1815–1854), Welsh writer
 George Baxter (actor) (1905–1976), French-American actor in films such as Thirty-Day Princess

See also
 Baxter (name)